Maljkovo  is a settlement in the Hrvace municipality in Croatia . It is connected by the D1 highway.

Populated places in Split-Dalmatia County